The Cascade and Columbia River Railroad  is a short line railroad that interchanges with BNSF Railway in Wenatchee, Washington and runs north to Oroville. 

The line from Wenatchee to Oroville was built in 1914 by the Great Northern Railway to link the main line at Wenatchee to the Washington & Great Northern/Vancouver, Victoria & Eastern (Canada) line running through Oroville (originally a branch of the Spokane Falls and Northern Railway built seven years earlier.)

The former Burlington Northern W-O Branch was purchased by the RailAmerica Corporation in September 1996. Genesee & Wyoming later acquired the railroad in late 2012.

The railroad line follows the Columbia River Valley north from Wenatchee to the Okanogan River Valley and north to Oroville, just north of where the Smilkameen River joins the Okanogan River.

Commodities hauled on the railroad consist mainly of timber products, as well as limestone.  CSCD moved around 5,200 carloads in 2008.

References

External links

Cascade and Columbia River Railroad at Genesee & Wyoming 
C&O fan site

Washington (state) railroads
RailAmerica
Spin-offs of the BNSF Railway
Transportation in Okanogan County, Washington